Smashing Through is a 1918 American silent Western film directed by Elmer Clifton and starring Herbert Rawlinson, Neal Hart and Sam De Grasse.

Cast
 Herbert Rawlinson as Jack Mason
 Neal Hart as Dave Marco
 Sam De Grasse as Earl Foster
 Millard K. Wilson as Ralph Brandon
 Sally Starr as Holly Brandon
 Clarissa Selwynne as Mrs Brandon
 Paul Hurst as Stevens

References

Bibliography
 James Robert Parish & Michael R. Pitts. Film directors: a guide to their American films. Scarecrow Press, 1974.

External links
 

1918 films
1918 Western (genre) films
American black-and-white films
1910s English-language films
Films directed by Elmer Clifton
Silent American Western (genre) films
Universal Pictures films
1910s American films